Tower 49 is an office skyscraper in the Midtown Manhattan neighborhood of New York City. The lot has frontage on both 48th and 49th Streets between Fifth Avenue and Madison Avenue. The street frontages were offset by about the width of an NYC brownstone lot on both sides.

The firm of Skidmore, Owings and Merrill devised a "simple crystalline form" of two chamfer-cornered masses joined by the central service core and wrapped in blue-tinted mirror glass.

Tenants include the Major League Baseball Players Association and Axis Communications. Tower 49 is one of the few buildings to have a registered trademark symbol as part of its official name.

Tower 49 Gallery
Tower 49 Gallery collaborates with artists on long term exhibitions and will typically invite a curator to organize and write the catalog essay for the exhibition. The concept of the gallery is to give the public a chance to enjoy art, and to display artworks in a space where people are living and working. During the year 2002 Tower 49 displayed 5 large paintings in the lobby by the New York artist Ronnie Landfield.

Exhibitions
 Ronnie Landfield, January 2002 – December 2002 
 Jules Olitski, July 2013 – July 2014
 Natvar Bhavsar Rang Rasa, October 7, 2014 – March 12, 2015 | Catalog Essay by Carter Ratcliff 
 The Bennington Legacy: Willard Boepple, Isaac Witkin and James Wolfe, April 30 – October 29, 2015 | Co-Curated by Karen Wilkin and Ai Kato
 Big Redux: Friedel Dzubas, November 9, 2015 – April 9, 2016 | Catalog Essay by Patrica Lewy
 Free Fall by Cordy Ryman, May 2017 – April 2018 | Catalog Essay by Thomas Micchelli Co-curated by Thomas Micchelli and Ai Kato
 Strategic Misbehavior by Michele Oka Doner, April 2018 – May 2019 | Catalog Essay by Deborah Rothschild
 Inside Out by Enrico Isamu Oyama, May 2019 – August 2020 | Catalog Essay by Eric Shiner

See also
Tower 42, London
List of tallest buildings in New York City

References

External links

Tower 49 Gallery
Tower 49

Skyscraper office buildings in Manhattan
Office buildings completed in 1985
1985 establishments in New York City
Midtown Manhattan
Skidmore, Owings & Merrill buildings